Ross Irwin may refer to:

 Ross Irwin (musician), Australian musician
 Ross Irwin (soccer) (born 1960), former professional soccer player from Scotland